"Banjo" Bill Cornett (1890–1960) was a traditional folk singer and banjo player from Eastern Kentucky.

Cornett was born on July 2, 1890 in Knott County, Kentucky. His music was recorded by John Cohen for Folkways and appears on the album Mountain Music of Kentucky. In 1956 he was elected as State Representative in Kentucky and he once played his composition “Old Age Pension Blues” on the floor of the Legislature.  On January 12, 1960, he died of a heart attack while playing his banjo in a Frankfort, Kentucky restaurant. Banjo Bill was thought to have originally written “Man of Constant Sorrow”, made famous by Alison Krauss & Union Station. Early memories from his family recall him singing and picking the song around the house.

References 

1890 births
1960 deaths
American banjoists
American folk singers
Members of the Kentucky House of Representatives
People from Knott County, Kentucky
20th-century American politicians